Limnaecia monoxantha is a moth of the family Cosmopterigidae. It is known from Australia.

References

Limnaecia
Taxa named by Edward Meyrick
Moths described in 1922
Moths of Australia